The Washington Huskies college football team represents the University of Washington in the North Division of the Pac-12 Conference (Pac-12). The Huskies compete as part of the National Collegiate Athletic Association (NCAA) Division I Football Bowl Subdivision. The program has had 30 head coaches since it began play during the 1889 season.  Kalen DeBoer is the current head coach.

The Huskies have played more than 1,100 games over 122 seasons. In that time, eight coaches have led the Huskies in postseason bowl games: Enoch Bagshaw, James Phelan, Ralph Welch, Jim Owens, Don James, Jim Lambright, Rick Neuheisel, and Steve Sarkisian. Eight of those coaches also won conference championships: Gil Dobie, Claude J. Hunt, Phelan and Bradshaw captured a combined four as a member of the Pacific Coast Conference and Owens, James, Lambright, and Neuheisel won a combined 11 as a member of the Pac-10. During his tenure James won a national championships with the Huskies.

James is the leader in seasons coached and games won, with 153 victories during his 18 years with the program. Dobie, who was undefeated during his nine seasons with Washington, has the highest winning percentage of those who have coached more one game at .975. Stub Allison has the lowest winning percentage of those who have coached more than one game, with .167. Of the 30 different head coaches who have led the Huskies, Dobie, Phelan, Darrell Royal, Owens, and James have been inducted into the College Football Hall of Fame in South Bend, Indiana.

Key

Coaches

Notes

References 
General

 
 

Specific

Washington

Washington (state) sports-related lists
Seattle-related lists